is the 1st single by Berryz Kobo × Cute  (pronounced Berikyū), a collaboration unit between the Japanese idol groups Berryz Kobo and Cute. The single was released on November 9, 2011.

It's a middle school graduation song.

Background 
Different versions of the single were released simultaneously on two record labels: Berryz Kobo's version was published by Piccolo Town, which is the Berryz Kobo's label, while Cute's version was published by the C-ute's label, Zetima.
There were 3 editions of each version: Regular Edition (CD only), Limited Edition A (CD+DVD), Limited Edition B (CD only).

There was also a so-called Event V, a DVD containing several versions of the music video for the song "Amazuppai Haru ni Sakura Saku", released.

The title song was appointed as the ending theme for Ōsama Game, a BS-TBS horror movie in which members of both Berryz Kobo and Cute played.

It is a graduation song, but, as Maimi Yajima pointed out, it's not a sad farewell song, but rather a positive journey song.

First "Amazuppai Haru ni Sakura Saku" will be included in the Hello! Project compilation album Petit Best 12 and later in the Cute's upcoming 2012 album Dai Nana Shō 'Utsukushikutte Gomen ne'. It will also be present on the Berryz Kobo's upcoming album Ai no Album 8.

Critical reception 
Hotexpress's Tetsuo Hiraga wrote in his review: "The song has a consistent utterly happy and cute typical idol groove". But the reviewer also added that the song seemed very "chaotic" to him.

CD single

Track listing 
All songs written and composed by Tsunku.

Arrangement:
 "Amazuppai Haru ni Sakura Saku": Takumi Masanori
 "Kirai de Kirai de Kirai": Kōichi Yuasa
 "Tanjun Sugi na no Watashi..." : Yuichi Takahashi

Berryz Kobo Version

C-ute Version

Charts

References

External links 
 Review: Amazuppai Haru ni Sakura Saku / Berryz Kobo × Cute - Hotexpress

Berryz Kobo Version 
 Profile on the Up-Front Works official website - Up-Front Works
 Profile on the Hello! Project official website

Cute Version 
 Profile on the Up-Front Works official website
 Profile on the Hello! Project official website

2011 singles
Japanese film songs
Japanese-language songs
Cute (Japanese idol group) songs
Berryz Kobo songs
Songs written by Tsunku
Song recordings produced by Tsunku
Zetima Records singles
2011 songs
Piccolo Town singles